This article is about the particular significance of the year 1949 to Wales and its people.

Incumbents
Archbishop of Wales
David Prosser, Bishop of St David's (retired)
John Morgan, Bishop of Llandaff (elected)
Archdruid of the National Eisteddfod of Wales – Wil Ifan

Events
Easter - Urdd Gobaith Cymru holds its first "Celtic camp".
April - The government decides to establish an Advisory Council for Wales.
20 May - Council for Wales and Monmouthshire first meets, with Huw T. Edwards as its first chairman.
12 June - Britain’s first all-world Muslim conference is held in Cardiff.
21 September
The first comprehensive school in Wales is opened in Holyhead, Anglesey.
A meteorite falls through the roof of the Prince Llewelyn Hotel, Beddgelert.
John Morgan is enthroned as Archbishop of Wales.
4 November - Cwmbran is designated as the first New Town in Wales under powers of the New Towns Act 1946.
26 December - The Gwyn Nicholls memorial gates at Cardiff Arms Park are officially opened.
date unknown
Closure of the granite quarry at Llanbedrog.
Sale of Bron-y-garth, Porthmadog, ancestral home of Sir Lewis Casson.
Bodnant Garden donated to the National Trust.
Meteorologist David Brunt is knighted.
Gwynfor Evans is elected to Merionethshire County Council.
Jack Jones spends three months in the USA promoting the Moral Re-Armament Movement.

Arts and literature
May - Dylan and Caitlin Thomas settle at the Boat House, Laugharne.
Geraint Evans stars in The Marriage of Figaro at Covent Garden.
Huw Menai is granted a civil list pension.

Awards
National Eisteddfod of Wales (held in Dolgellau)
National Eisteddfod of Wales: Chair - Roland Jones, "Y Graig"
National Eisteddfod of Wales: Crown - John Tudor James, "Meirionnydd"
National Eisteddfod of Wales: Prose Medal - withheld

New books

English language
Dannie Abse - After Every Green Thing
Stan Awbery - Labour's Early Struggles in Swansea
David James Davies - Towards an Economic Democracy
Cledwyn Hughes - A Wanderer in North Wales
Arthur Leach - Charles Norris of Tenby and Waterwynch
Gordon Macdonald, 1st Baron Macdonald of Gwaenysgor - Newfoundland at the Cross Roads
Thomas Mardy-Jones - Character, Coal and Corn – the Roots of British Power
Bertrand Russell - Authority and the Individual
Gwyn Thomas - All Things Betray Thee

Welsh language
Aneirin Talfan Davies - Gwyr Llen
Richard Davies (Isgarn) - Caniadau Isgarn (posthumously published)
John Daniel Vernon Lewis - Bydd melys fy myfyrdod: detholiad o lyfr y Salmau
Kate Roberts - Stryd y Glep
Louie Myfanwy Thomas
as Jane Ann Jones - Y bryniau pell
as Ffanni Llwyd - Diwrnod yw ein bywyd (submitted to National Eisteddfod; published 1954)
William Nantlais Williams - Emynau'r daith

Music
Ivor Novello - King's Rhapsody
Grace Williams - Fantasia on Welsh Nursery Tunes - first recording, made by London Symphony Orchestra conducted by Mansel Thomas (first recording of any work by a female Welsh composer)

Film
Blue Scar, starring Kenneth Griffith and Rachel Thomas
The Last Days of Dolwyn, starring Emlyn Williams, Richard Burton and Hugh Griffith
Yr Etifeddiaeth (The Heritage), documentary by Geoff Charles and John Roberts Williams, depicting traditional ways of life in rural North Wales, with narration by Cynan; the first film to be made in the Welsh language
The Fruitful Year, a promotional film about Wales, commissioned by the Post Office National Savings
The Road to Yesterday, travelogue made for troops serving abroad

Broadcasting
January - Glyn Griffiths writes: "It would be advisable now for Wales to weigh in with its campaign of aggravation and persuasion to get a Welsh Radio Corporation."

Sport
Football - John Charles joins Leeds United
Netball - The Welsh team plays its first international matches, against Scotland and England
Rugby Union
26 March - France beats Wales 5–3 at the Stade Colombes in Paris
26 December - Rhys Gabe officially opens the Gwyn Nicholls Memorial Gates at Cardiff Arms Park.
Steeplechasing - The first Welsh Grand National to be run at Chepstow Racecourse is won by Dick Francis riding Fighting Line.

Births
1 January - Sue Jones-Davies, actress, singer and local politician
7 February - Martin Daunton, historian and academic
2 March - J. P. R. Williams, rugby player
5 March - Mike Gwilym, actor
9 March - Neil Hamilton, politician
22 March - John Toshack, footballer and football manager
14 April - Dennis Bryon, rock drummer
22 May 
Ieuan Wyn Jones AM, politician
Derek Quinnell, rugby player
5 June - Ken Follett, novelist
11 June - Tom Pryce, racing driver (killed in racing accident 1977)
14 June - Alan Evans, darts player (died 1999)
23 June - Hilary Boyd, novelist
16 July - Angharad Rees, actress (died 2012)
15 August - Richard Deacon, sculptor and academic
25 August (in Oxford) - Martin Amis, novelist
24 October - Nick Ainger, politician
29 October - Alun Ffred Jones AM, politician
18 November - William Graham AM, politician
15 December (in Epsom) - Jane Hutt AM, politician
date unknown
Anthony O'Donnell, actor
M. J. Trow, writer

Deaths
20 January - Artie Moore, wireless operator (born 1887)
21 January
J. H. Thomas, politician, 72
Rowley Thomas, Wales international rugby player, 85
7 March - T. Gwynn Jones ("Tir-na-Nog"), poet and journalist, 77
20 April - Sir Evan Davies Jones, 1st Baronet, civil engineer and politician, 90
21 April - Sir Alfred Thomas Davies, civil servant, 88
27 April - Evan Morgan, 2nd Viscount Tredegar, poet and occulist, 55
1 May - Horace Lyne, Wales international rugby player and WRU president, 88
3 May - David John Tawe Jones, composer, 64
8 May - Abel J. Jones, teacher, writer and public servant
6 June - Walter E. Rees, Secretary of the Welsh Rugby Union, 86
3 July - William McCutcheon, Wales international rugby player, 78/79
23 July - John Bodvan Anwyl (Bodfan), lexicographer, 74
10 August - William Jones Williams, public servant, 86
26 August - Edgar Chappell, sociologist, 70
1 September - Dr Teddy Morgan, Welsh international rugby player, 69
24 October - T. Rowland Hughes, author, 46
9 November - William Dowell, Wales dual code rugby international, 64
16 December - George Maitland Lloyd Davies, pacifist politician, 59

See also
1949 in Northern Ireland

References

 
Wales